Cortez Stubbs (born August 16, 1988) is an American football defensive back who is currently a free agent. He played college football at the Concordia College Alabama and attended Huffman High School in Birmingham, Alabama. Stubbs has been a member of the Columbus Lions, Jacksonville Sharks, Alabama Hammers, Orlando Predators, New Orleans VooDoo and Tampa Bay Storm.

Early life
Stubbs played football at Huffman High School.

College career
Stubbs played for the Concordia College Hornets from 2007 to 2010. He was a starter his final two season.

Professional career

Columbus Lions
Stubbs played in 2012 with the Columbus Lions of the Professional Indoor Football League. Stubbs performed well enough that he was named Second Team All-PIFL.

Jacksonville Sharks
On December 5, 2012, Stubbs was assigned to the Jacksonville Sharks. On March 16, 2013, Stubbs was placed on reassignment.

Knoxville NightHawks
Upon Stubbs' reassignment by the Sharks, the Lions traded him to the Knoxville NightHawks for future considerations.

Alabama Hammers
Stubbs was traded to the Alabama Hammers. Stubbs helped the Hammers win PIFL Cup II.

Orlando Predators
Stubbs was assigned to the Orlando Predators to final the 2013 season. The Predators picked up Stubbs' rookie option for 2014.

New Orleans VooDoo
Stubbs was assigned to the New Orleans VooDoo for the 2015 season.

Tampa Bay Storm
On January 14, 2016, Stubbs was assigned to the Tampa Bay Storm. The Storm folded in December 2017.

References

External links

Living people
1988 births
Players of American football from Alabama
American football defensive backs
Concordia College (Alabama) Hornets football players
Columbus Lions players
Jacksonville Sharks players
Knoxville NightHawks players
Alabama Hammers players
Orlando Predators players
New Orleans VooDoo players
Tampa Bay Storm players